Three Words or 3 Words may refer to:
 
Three Words (book), a 2016 New Zealand comics anthology
"Three Words" (The X-Files), a 2001 TV episode
3 Words, a 2009 album by Cheryl Cole
"3 Words" (song), a 2009 song by Cheryl Cole
"Three Words" (song), a 2016 song by Sechs Kies
"Three Words", a 2013 song by Marcus Canty from This...Is Marcus Canty
"Three Words", a 2002 song by No Angels from the single "Still in Love with You"

See also
"Three Words, Two Hearts, One Night", a 1995 song by Mark Collie 1995
Three Little Words (disambiguation)
What3words, a geolocation system